Luke Godden (born 21 September 1978) is a former Australian rules footballer in the Australian Football League

Godden was drafted in the 1995 AFL Draft at number 40 to Collingwood after playing with the Northern Knights U18 side and starting at Yarrambat junior football club. His jumper was number 43 and played in the reserves during the first season at the club, and most of his second season, before breaking into the side for a debut late in the year. He played 36 games in 1998 at half-back, normally a receiving player, yet he played the game hard. His played well under pressure and was a great at being able to get the ball in most situations. In 1999 he had a good season statistically, playing consistent football, averaging 16 disposals a game, but with the side not performing, he was part of a process which Mick Malthouse adopted in re-constructing the side, surprising most when Godden was delisted.

External links 

Australian rules footballers from Victoria (Australia)
Collingwood Football Club players
1978 births
Living people
Northern Knights players